Oxide dispersion strengthened alloys (ODS) are alloys that consist of a metal matrix with small oxide particles dispersed within it. They have high heat resistance, strength, and ductility. Alloys of nickel are the most common but includes iron aluminum alloys. 

Applications include high temperature turbine blades and heat exchanger tubing, while steels are used in nuclear applications. ODS materials are used on spacecraft to protect the vehicle, especially during re-entry. Noble metal ODS alloys, for example, platinum-based alloys, are used in glass production.

When it comes to re-entry at hypersonic speeds, the properties of gases change dramatically. Shock waves that can cause serious damage on any structure are created. At these speeds and temperatures, oxygen becomes aggressive.

Mechanism 
Oxide dispersion strengthening is based on incoherency of the oxide particles within the lattice of the material. Coherent particles have a continuous lattice plane from the matrix to the particles whereas incoherent particles do not have this continuity and therefore both lattice planes end at the interface. This mismatch in interfaces results in a high interfacial energy, which impedes dislocation. The oxide particles instead are stable in the matrix, which helps prevent creep. Particle stability implies little dimensional change, embrittlement, effects on properties, stable particle spacing, and general resistance to change at high temperatures. 

Since the oxide particles are incoherent, dislocations can only overcome the particles by climb. If instead the particles are semi-coherent or coherent with the lattice, dislocations can simply cut the particles by a more favourable process that requires less energy called dislocation glide or by Orowan bowing between particles, both of which are athermal mechanisms. Dislocation climb is a diffusional process, which is less energetically favourable, and mostly occurs at higher temperatures that provide enough energy to advance via the addition and removal of atoms. Because the particles are incoherent, glide mechanisms alone are not enough and the more energetically exhausting climb process is dominant, meaning that dislocations are stopped more effectively. Climb can occur either at the particle-dislocation interface (local climb) or by overcoming multiple particles at once (general climb). In local climb, the part of the dislocation that is between two particles stays in the glide plane while the rest of the dislocation is climbing along the surface of the particle. For general climb, the dislocations all come out the glide plane. General climb requires less energy because the mechanism decreases the dislocation line length which reduces the elastic strain energy and therefore is the common climb mechanism. For γ’ volume fractions of 0.4 to 0.6 in nickel-based alloys, the threshold stress for local climb is only about 1.25 to 1.40 times higher than general climb. 

Dislocations are not limited to either all local or all general climb as the path that requires less energy is taken. Cooperative climb is an example of a more nuanced mechanism where a dislocation travels around a group of particles rather than climbing past each particle individually. McLean stated that the dislocation is most relaxed when climbing over multiple particles because of the skipping of some of the abrupt interfaces between segments in the glide plane to segments that travel along the particle surface.

The presence of incoherent particles introduces a threshold stress (σt), since an additional stress will have to be applied for the dislocations to move past the oxides by climb. After overcoming a particle by climb, dislocations can remain pinned at the particle-matrix interface with an attractive phenomenon called interfacial pinning, which requires additional threshold stress to free a dislocation out of this pinning, which must be overcome for plastic deformation to occur. This detachment phenomenon is a result of the interaction between the particle and the dislocation where total elastic strain energy is reduced. Schroder and Arzt explain that the additional stress required is due to the relaxation caused by the reduction in the stress field as the dislocation climbs and accommodates the shear traction. The following equations represent the strain rate and stress as a result of oxide introduction.

Strain Rate:

Threshold Shear Stress:

Synthesis

Ball-milling 
ODS steels creep properties are dependent on the characteristics of the oxide particles in the metal matrix, specifically their ability to prevent dislocation motion as well as the size and distribution of the particles. Hoelzer and coworkers showed that an alloy containing a homogeneous dispersion of 1-5 nm Y2Ti2O7 nanoclusters has superior creep properties to an alloy with a heterogeneous dispersion of 5-20 nm nanoclusters of the same composition.  

ODS steels are commonly produced through ball-milling an oxide of interest (e.g. Y2O3, Al2O3) with pre-alloyed metal powders followed by compression and sintering. It is believed that the oxides enter into solid solution with the metal during ball-milling and subsequently precipitate during the thermal treatment. This process seems simple but many parameters need to be carefully controlled to produce a successful alloy. Leseigneur and coworkers carefully controlled some of these parameters and achieved more consistent and better microstructures. In this two step method the oxide is ball-milled for longer periods to ensure a homogeneous solid solution of the oxide. The powder is annealed at higher temperatures to begin a controlled nucleation of the oxide clusters. Finally the powder is again compressed and sintered to yield the final material.

Additive manufacturing 
The alloy also featured improved strength, malleability, and durability. The printer dispersed oxide particles uniformly throughout the metal matrix. The alloy was identified using 30 simulations of thermodynamic modeling.

Advantages and disadvantages 
Advantages:

 Can be machined, brazed, formed, cut with available processes.
 Develops a protective oxide layer that is self-healing.
 This oxide layer is stable and has a high emission coefficient.
 Allows the design of thin-walled structures (sandwich).
 Resistant to harsh weather conditions in the troposphere.
 Low maintenance cost.
 Low material cost.

Disadvantages:

 It has a higher expansion coefficient than other materials, causing higher thermal stresses.
 Higher density.
 Lower maximum allowable temperature.

See also
 Superalloy

References

Alloys
Metallurgy